The NWA North American Tag Team Championship (Florida version) was a professional wrestling tag team championship briefly used and defended in the National Wrestling Alliance affiliated Championship Wrestling from Florida between March 1981 and April 1982. The title was used as a replacement for the Florida version of the NWA United States Tag Team Championship, which was defended off and on in the promotion throughout the 60s, 70s and 80s. The Florida version of the North American Tag Team Championship was the fourth NWA affiliated promotion to create its own version of the title. Although its name would suggest otherwise, it was only defended within the Florida territory and not on any national basis.

Title history

Footnotes

References

External links
NWA North American Tag Team Title Histories

Championship Wrestling from Florida championships
National Wrestling Alliance championships
Professional wrestling in Florida